Kalanaur is a town and a municipal committee in Rohtak district of the north Indian state of Haryana.

Geography
It has an average elevation of 200 metres (656 feet).

Demographics
 India census, Kalanaur had a population of 16,847. Males constitute 53% of the population and females 47%. Kalanaur has an average literacy rate of 65%, higher than the national average of 59.5%: male literacy is 72%, and female literacy is 58%. In Kalanaur, 15% of the population is under 6 years of age.
According to 2011 Kalanaur had population of 22,752.

Notable people
 Bharat Bhushan Batra, MLA from Rohtak in the Haryana Legislative Assembly. 2009-2014 and 2019 to present.

Schools and colleges
Swami Guru Charan Dass Sanatan Dharm Sr. Sec. School (SGDSD)
 MSIET ( Maa Saraswati Institute of Engineering & Technology ) Kalanaur, Rohtak. www.msiet.com

References

Cities and towns in Rohtak district